Imanol is a given name and the Basque language equivalent of Immanuel. It is the first name of several notable people:

Imanol Agirretxe (born 1987), Spanish football forward
Imanol Arias (born 1956), Spanish actor
Imanol Erviti (born 1983), Spanish road cyclist
Imanol Alguacil (born 1971), Spanish football defender
Imanol Etxeberria (born 1973), Spanish football goalkeeper
Imanol Harinordoquy (born 1980), French international rugby union player
Imanol Landeta (born 1987; formerly Imanol), Mexican actor and singer

Basque masculine given names
Theophoric names